Thekke Curuppathe Narendran (24 February 1944 – 31 December 2013; middle name sometimes written Kuruppathe) was an Indian entomologist specializing in the systematics of parasitic wasps in the superfamily Chalcidoidea (Hymenoptera).

Narendran received a Janakiammal National Award for Taxonomy (2004) and was a Fellow of the Indian Academy of Sciences, Bangalore (IASc) and the Indian Entomology Academy, Chennai.

His major publications include monographs on the Oriental Chalcididae (1989), Torymidae & Eurytomidae of Indian Subcontinent (1994) and Indo-Australian Ormyridae (1999) - and some 300 research papers in various scientific journals describing 700 new species and over 50 new genera. Narendran mentored a number of taxonomists at the Calicut University where he worked.

He died of a heart attack on 31 December 2013, aged 69.

Key publications
  1974. Oriental Brachymeria. Department of Zoology, University of Calicut, Kerala, India.
  1989. Oriental Chalcididae (Hymenoptera: Chalcidoidea). Zoological Monograph. Department of Zoology, University of Calicut, Kerala, India. 441pp.
  1994. Torymidae and Eurytomidae of Indian subcontinent. University of Calicut, Kerala, India. 500pp.
  1999. Indo-Australian Ormyridae (Hymenoptera: Chalcidoidea). Privately published. iii + 227 pp.
  2007. Indian Chalcidoid Parasitoids of the Tetrastichinae (Hymenoptera: Eulophidae). Occasional Paper No. 272, Zoological Survey of India, Kolkata. vi + 390pp.

Notes

References
 TCN Trust for Animal Taxonomy

Indian entomologists
Indian taxonomists
1944 births
2013 deaths
Scientists from Thrissur
Academic staff of the University of Calicut
20th-century Indian zoologists

21st-century Indian zoologists